Benita Eleanora Armstrong, nee Benita Jaeger later The Lady Strauss, (1907-2004) was British sculptor known for her bronze figurative work.

Biography
Armstrong was born into a Jewish family in Germany and moved to London in 1926. In London she lived in a flat above a restaurant in Charlotte Street and for several years was in a relationship with Clive Bell. After that relationship ended she met and, in 1932, married the British artist John Armstrong. Benita Armstrong studied under the Viennese sculptor Georg Ehrlich and was a frequent participant in group exhibitions in London and elsewhere as well as regularly having work included in the Royal Academy Summer Exhibitions. A solo exhibition of her work was held at the Drian Galleries in London in 1981. She and Armstrong separated and she eventually married the Labour Party politician George Russell Strauss with who she had two children.

References

1907 births
2004 deaths
20th-century British sculptors
20th-century British women artists
20th-century German women artists
German emigrants to the United Kingdom
Jewish women artists
English people of German-Jewish descent
Strauss
Spouses of life peers